Danilo Špoljarić (born 14 July 1999) is a Cypriot footballer who plays as a midfielder for Apollon Limassol.

Club career
Spoljaric started his senior career at Apollon Limassol  in 2018.   After performing well in the opportunities he had here, he signed a new 3-year contract with Apollon Limassol on 30 June 2019. On 1 July 2019, Apollon Limassol was loaned to Enosis Neon Paralimni on a one-year loan. He came back to Apollon Limassol from Enosis Neon Paralimni on June 30, 2020. It was then leased to Zemplín Michalovce by Apollon Limassol on 22 August 2020 for one year.Špoljarić returned to Apollon Limassol on loan on 31 June 2021.Špoljarić scored her first career goal for Apollon Limassol in the 2021-22 season in the 51st minute of their 2-1 loss against AEK Larnaca on 8 January 2022. He scored his second goal in the 2021-22 season in the 11th minute of the match, which they won 1-4 against Aris Limassol.Špoljarić has not contributed a goal so far in the 2022-23 season.

International career
Špoljarić debuted with the Cyprus national team in a 0–0 2020–21 UEFA Nations League tie with Estonia on 24 March 2022.Špoljarić was invited to Cyprus national team for friendlies on 11 November 2022.

Personal life
Danilo Špoljarić is the son of former Apollon Limassol and Cyprus international midfielder Milenko Špoljarić. He has two older brothers, Alexander Špoljarić and Matija Špoljarić who are also footballers.

Career statistics

Club

International

Honours

Apollon Limassol
Cypriot First Division: 2021–22

References

External links

 CFA Profile

1999 births
Living people
Sportspeople from Limassol
Cypriot footballers
Cyprus international footballers
Cyprus youth international footballers
Cypriot people of Serbian descent
Cypriot people of Croatian descent
Association football midfielders
Apollon Limassol FC players
Enosis Neon Paralimni FC players
MFK Zemplín Michalovce players
Cypriot First Division players
Slovak Super Liga players
Expatriate footballers in Slovakia
Cypriot expatriate sportspeople in Slovakia